Henry Van Aernam (March 11, 1819 – June 1, 1894) was a United States representative from New York.

Early life
Born in Marcellus, Onondaga County, Van Aerman pursued an academic course, and studied medicine at the Geneva and Willoughby Medical Colleges and practiced his profession.

Career
Van Aernam was a member of the New York State Assembly (Cattaraugus Co., 1st D.) in 1858. In the spring of 1858, at the close of the legislature, he returned to his practice.

During the United States Civil War Van Aernam enrolled in the Union Army as a surgeon in the One Hundred and Fifty-fourth Regiment, New York Volunteer Infantry, and served from September 26, 1862 to November 5, 1864.

A slavery-hating abolitionist, Van Aernam was a charter member of the Republican party. He was elected as a Republican to the Thirty-ninth and Fortieth Congresses, holding office from March 4, 1865 to March 3, 1869. He was appointed as Commissioner of Pensions on May 1, 1869, and held that office until May 31, 1871, when he resigned.

Elected to the Forty-sixth and Forty-seventh Congresses, Van Aernam again held office from March 4, 1879 to March 3, 1883. He resumed the practice of medicine in Franklinville, New York.

Death
Van Aernam died in Franklinville, New York on June 1, 1894 (age 75 years, 2 months, and 21 days). He is interred at Mount Prospect Cemetery, Franklinville, New York.

Family life
On November 30, 1845, Van Aernam married Amy Melissa Etheridge, and they had two children: a daughter, Isadora, and a son, Charles Duane.

Van Aernam's sister, Ann Van Aernam, married Benjamin Fuller, an early settler of Little Valley, New York. Ann and Benjamin's son would be named after Henry Van Aernam; Henry Van Aernam Fuller (1841–63) would die in the Battle of Gettysburg.

References

External links

 

1819 births
1894 deaths
Union Army surgeons
Republican Party members of the New York State Assembly
People from Franklinville, New York
People from Marcellus, New York
Republican Party members of the United States House of Representatives from New York (state)
19th-century American politicians